Branaplam (development codes LMI070 and NVS-SM1) is a pyridazine derivative that is being studied as an experimental drug. It was originally developed by Novartis to treat spinal muscular atrophy (SMA); since 2020 it is being developed to treat Huntington's disease (HD).

As a treatment for SMA, branaplam increases the amount of functional survival of motor neuron protein produced by the SMN2 gene through modifying its splicing pattern. It was studied since 2014 in a clinical trial in children with SMA type 1 until the programme was discontinued in 2021.

In October 2020, Novartis announced that branaplam lowers the level of huntingtin protein, which is one of the major therapeutic approaches in Huntington's disease. In 2021, U.S. Food and Drug Administration (FDA) granted an orphan drug status to branaplam for treatment of Huntington’s disease, and Novartis announced that they will set up clinical trials in 2021. In December 2021, branaplam received a Fast Track designation from the FDA towards a phase IIb study in adult patients with early-stage HD manifestation.

References

Spinal muscular atrophy
Experimental drugs
Novartis brands
Pyrazoles
Piperidines